Stephen “Steve” Fuchs is a former U.S. soccer goalkeeper.  Fuchs earned three caps with the U.S. national team in 1988.

Youth and college
Fuchs grew up in St. Louis, Missouri where he played for the Scott Gallagher youth soccer club.  He attended DeSmet Jesuit High School.  Following high school, he attended St. Louis University where he played on the men's soccer team from 1983 to 1986.  In 1986, he was named to the second team All-American list.

National team
In 1987, Fuchs was on the U.S. Pan American Games soccer team.  Fuchs earned three caps with the U.S. national team in 1988.  He earned his first cap in a 1–0 loss to Guatemala on January 10, 1988.  His next two caps came in June 1988.  On June 1, 1988, the U.S. tied Chile 1-1 and four days later, they lost to Chile 3–0.

References

American soccer players
Association football goalkeepers
United States men's international soccer players
Saint Louis University alumni
Saint Louis Billikens men's soccer players
Soccer players from St. Louis
Pan American Games competitors for the United States
Footballers at the 1987 Pan American Games